The 1993 NCAA Division II Men's Soccer Championship was the 22nd annual tournament held by the NCAA to determine the top men's Division II college soccer program in the United States.

Seattle Pacific (18-2-1) defeated defending champions Southern Connecticut, 1–0, in the final. This was the fifth national title for the Falcons, who were coached by Cliff McCrath.

Bracket

Final

See also  
 NCAA Division I Men's Soccer Championship
 NCAA Division III Men's Soccer Championship
 NAIA Men's Soccer Championship

References 

NCAA Division II Men's Soccer Championship
NCAA Division II Men's Soccer Championship
NCAA Division II Men's Soccer Championship
NCAA Division II Men's Soccer Championship